Nhok Them (22 June 1903 – 1974) was a Cambodian writer known for his novel Kolab Pailin.

Childhood and education 
Them was born in a farmer family in Svay Por Commune, Sangkae District, Battambang, Cambodia. In 1913, he studied in Por Veal Pagoda in Sangkae District, Battambang. He studied Khmer literature with Teacher Sorn and learnt Dharma with Teacher Eav Touch in Por Veal Pagoda.

In 1918, he was ordained. He studied Dharma with other monks in Battambang. He went to study in Bangkok, Thailand in 1919. He got a lot of certificates related to Buddhism. In 1936, he decided to left monk hood.

Career 
When he went to Thailand, he worked there. He worked as a Pali teacher in Bangkok from 1927 to 1930 before returning to Phnom Penh to be a member of the Tripitaka Committee at the Buddhist Institute. In 1938, he worked at the Royal Library of Cambodia as a publishing manager for Kambujsuriya Magazine. The next year (1939), he was appointed to represent Norodom Sothearos and the Buddhist Institute to prepare curriculums and to inaugurate the Buddhist Institute in Luang Phrabang and Vientiane, Laos. In 1942, he inaugurate the Buddhist Institute in Kliang province and in 1943, he was a representative for preparing curriculum for the Buddhist Institute in Pakse, Laos.

In 1946, he worked at the Buddhist Institute and became a professor at Lycée Sisowath. He resigned from the Buddhist Institute in 1950 and worked at the Ministry of National Education (ក្រសួងសិក្សាធិការជាតិ).

Work 
While in Thailand, he wrote books in Thai and Bali Thai. Those include Neakmokkatha, Neaneacheadork, Vannea, Thom Niteas Part 1, Tevada Pheasit and Puth Peasit.

In addition, he was the author of many works incorporating:

Marriage Life 
In 1937, Them married Ngoun Naisim at Psar Oudong, Veangchas District, Odongk District, Kampong Speu Province and had 7 sons and 4 daughters.

References 

1903 births
Cambodian male writers
1974 deaths
Cambodian writers
20th-century male writers
People from Battambang province